Dating Game Killer, also known as The Dating Game Killer, is a 2017 biographical television film about serial killer Rodney Alcala. It was directed by Peter Medak and broadcast on Investigation Discovery.

Plot
The film tells the story of Rodney Alcala, a convicted serial killer believed to be responsible for over 130 murders. In 1971, he is caught after having raped and beaten 8-year-old Rosie Hoffman, but because her parents move her to Mexico, she does not testify at Alcala's trial, and he is charged only with assault. He is repeatedly charged with abusing girls, but his good behavior and kind manners gain him preferable treatment and light sentences. He is repeatedly declared reformed, enabling him to commit more murders. In 1978 he appeared on the television show The Dating Game in the midst of his killing spree.

Alcala is ultimately identified by a park ranger who saw him walking with a murder victim named Tammy Jensen days before her body was discovered at the same location. This eyewitness account provides police with the evidence they need to finally arrest Alcala. In his Seattle storage locker they find the earrings Tammy Jensen was wearing when she disappeared, and he is sentenced to death. This conviction is overturned in 1984 due to the prosecution's reference to Alcala's previous crimes causing bias in the jury, but he is retried and sentenced to death again in 1986. A change in the law allows his DNA to be collected in 2002, connecting him to further murders. In 2010, Alcala represents himself at trial, calling on himself for testimony and answering his own questions. Rosie Hoffman returns 42 years after her attack to finally testify against her attacker, and her testimony as well as the testimony of Tammy Jensen's mother Carol help sentence Alcala to death for five counts of abduction, murder, and special circumstances. In 2012 he pleaded guilty to two more murders in New York. In 2016 he was charged with the 1977 murder of a woman in Wyoming.

Cast

Production
This was the first original scripted film produced by Investigation Discovery.

Reception
In a positive review for HuffPost, reviewer JR gave the film an A−, writing, "There was clearly a lot of time, discussion, and development about how to execute and deliver the story and it shows in the finished product right from the start." The reviewer went on to praise the acting, writing, "Guillermo Diaz and Carrie Preston deliver career best performances. Their courtroom scenes are so good, as a viewer you want to hit rewind and watch them again (I did three times). Carrie Preston should win the Emmy next September for Best Supporting Actress in a TV Movie or Miniseries.  Guillermo should be recognized as well come Emmy time."

References

External links
 

2017 television films
2017 films
2010s biographical films
2010s crime films
American biographical films
American crime films
American serial killer films
American television films
Biographical films about photographers
Biographical films about serial killers
Crime television films
Films about child abduction in the United States
Films about child sexual abuse
Films directed by Peter Medak
Films set in 1968
Films set in 1971
Films set in 1974
Films set in 1977
Films set in 1978
Films set in 1979
Films set in 1980
Films set in 2002
Films set in 2010
Films set in 2012
Films set in 2016
Films set in Brooklyn
Films set in California
Films set in Dallas
Films set in Los Angeles
Films set in New Hampshire
Films set in New York (state)
Films set in Orange County, California
Films set in Seattle
2010s English-language films
2010s American films